Soluk Bon-e Vosta (also Romanized as Solūk Bon-e Vosţá; also known as Solūk Bon-e Vasaţ) is a village in Shuil Rural District, Rahimabad District, Rudsar County, Gilan Province, Iran. At the 2006 census, its population was 27, in 7 families.

References 

Populated places in Rudsar County